Andrea Tozzo (born 30 August 1992) is an Italian footballer who plays as a goalkeeper for  club Cesena.

Club career

Verona
Born in Riva del Garda and raised in nearby Torbole, Trentino region, Tozzo started his career at Veneto club Hellas Verona F.C. in 2001. He was a player of the Allievi U16 team for the 2007–08 Veneto regional Allievi League. In the 2008–09 season he was part of the Allievi A team (U17) for the national Allievi League.

Fiorentina (loan)
Tozzo was promoted to the reserves of Verona for the reserve league dedicated to Lega Pro clubs, but at the start of season Serie A club ACF Fiorentina borrowed Tozzo for its reserve. He was the backup of Andrea Seculin and played 5 times.

Sampdoria
La Viola did not buy Tozzo outright; instead another first division club, U.C. Sampdoria, borrowed Tozzo with option to buy. Tozzo re-joined Luciano Bruni, vice-coach of Verona first team in 2008–09 season and the coach of Sampdoria reserve team in 2010–11, replacing the departed Marco Costantino as a key player of the reserve. He competed for the starting place with Davide Negretti, who started 13 times and Tozzo 12. In summer 2011 Sampdoria exercised the right to sign Tozzo in co-ownership deal for €100,000 on a four-year contract. Following the departure of Negretti, Tozzo was the only first choice of the reserve in 2011–12 season, in his last season as an eligible player. On 20 June 2012 the co-ownership was renewed.

On 2 August 2012, Tozzo, along with Moreno Beretta, Edoardo Blondett, Andrea Magrassi, Alessandro Martinelli and Giuseppe Zampano, was transferred to Italian third division club Portogruaro in a temporary deal. He became the starting keeper in the first match (round 2) of 2012–13 Lega Pro Prima Divisione, ahead Andrea Bavena who played both matches of the cup. In June 2013 the co-ownership was renewed again. During 2013 financial year he also signed a new five-year contract.

On 21 January 2014, Tozzo joined Serie B side Latina in a loan deal. On 20 June 2014 Sampdoria bought him outright for another €100,000.

Novara (loan)
On 31 July 2014, Tozzo was signed by Novara Calcio in a temporary deal. The club extended his loan of Tozzo on 10 July 2015 as well as buying Simone Corazza outright from Sampdoria.

Matera (loan)
On 31 January 2017, Tozzo was loaned to Matera, with Wladimiro Falcone returned to Sampdoria from Livorno, as Tozzo's replacement.

Verona (loan)
On 3 August 2018, Tozzo joined to Serie B side Hellas Verona a loan with option to buy.

Ternana
On 3 July 2019, Tozzo signed  a 3-years contract with Ternana.

Loan to Mantova
On 21 August 2020, he was loaned to Mantova.

Loans to Teramo and Seregno
On 11 August 2021, he joined Teramo on loan. On 22 January 2022, he moved on loan to Seregno.

Cesena
On 9 September 2022, Tozzo joined Cesena for the 2022–23 season.

Honours
Novara
 Supercoppa di Lega Pro: 2015
 Lega Pro: 2015

References

External links
 AIC profile (data by football.it) 
 

Living people
1992 births
Sportspeople from Trentino
Association football goalkeepers
Italian footballers
Italy youth international footballers
Hellas Verona F.C. players
ACF Fiorentina players
U.C. Sampdoria players
A.S.D. Portogruaro players
Latina Calcio 1932 players
Novara F.C. players
Matera Calcio players
Ternana Calcio players
Mantova 1911 players
S.S. Teramo Calcio players
U.S. 1913 Seregno Calcio players
Cesena F.C. players
Serie B players
Serie C players
Footballers from Trentino-Alto Adige/Südtirol